Verney  may refer to:

People
Verney family
Luís António Verney, Portuguese philosopher, theologian, and pedagogue
Anne-Charlotte Verney, French racing and rally driver
Russ Verney, American political advisor

Places
Beth-Eden, also known as Verney, a heritage-listed house in Brisbane, Queensland, Australia
Verney Junction, a hamlet in Buckinghamshire, England
Verney Junction railway station, a disused railway station in Buckinghamshire, England
Verney Lake, a lake in Aosta Valley, Italy
Lac du Verney, a lake in Isère, France

Business
Verney-Carron, a French weapon manufacturer

See also
 Vernay (disambiguation)
 Verny (disambiguation)